The Matthias Corvinus House (Romanian: Casa Matia) is one of the oldest buildings in  Cluj-Napoca, Transylvania, Romania. It was built in the 15th century, in the gothic style, as a small guesthouse. During its history, the house served as a jail, hospital, and museum; it is now home to a visual arts institute.

Matthias Corvinus (Hungarian: Hunyadi Mátyás, Romanian: Matia Corvin), son of John Hunyadi, later one of the most renowned Kings of Hungary, was born in this building on 23 February 1443. That time the house was owned by Jakab (James) Méhffi, who was a well-to-do wine-grower and merchant in the city. On 28 September 1467, king Matthias gave tax and duty exemption privilege for all descendants of the Méhffi family, the owner of the building.

The house has been owned by the Art and Design University of Cluj-Napoca since 1950.

External links

 The house of Matthias Corvinus, the only king born in Cluj

Buildings and structures in Cluj-Napoca
History of Cluj-Napoca
Hunyadi family
Houses in Romania
Hungarian culture
Gothic architecture in Romania
15th-century architecture